The Victoria Royals are a Canadian major junior ice hockey team currently members of the B.C. Division of the Western Conference in the Western Hockey League (WHL). The team began play during the 2011–12 season after the League announced the relocation of the Chilliwack Bruins to Victoria. It marked the return of the WHL to Vancouver Island, 17 years after the departure of the Victoria Cougars. The Royals are based in Victoria, British Columbia, and play their home games at the Save-On-Foods Memorial Centre.

History

Victoria was left without a WHL team when the Cougars franchise relocated to Prince George in 1994. The city acquired a professional ECHL team in the Victoria Salmon Kings in 2004 when the Save-On-Foods Memorial Centre was opened, but the city had made inquiries about returning the WHL to Vancouver Island in the past.

While two minority owners of the Chilliwack Bruins hoped to purchase the team and keep it in Chilliwack following the 2010–11 season, they were outvoted by the remaining partners who opted to sell the team to a group planning to relocate the franchise. On April 20, 2011, the WHL announced the approval of both the sale, and the relocation of the Bruins to Victoria.

The relocation was brought about partially by the WHL's desire to protect the Victoria market, as the league feared that a potential summer relocation of the National Hockey League (NHL)'s Phoenix Coyotes to Winnipeg could result in the American Hockey League (AHL)'s Manitoba Moose moving to Victoria. The Moose ultimately moved to St. John's, Newfoundland and Labrador and became the St. John's IceCaps, when the Atlanta Thrashers moved to Winnipeg to become the second incarnation of the Jets.

The Royals played their first game, a 5–2 loss against the Vancouver Giants in Vancouver on September 23, 2011. They won their first game in franchise history on September 24, 2011, defeating the Giants 5–3, in front of a sold-out crowd of 7,006 at Save-On-Foods Memorial Centre in Victoria.

On March 16, 2012, the Royals defeated the Portland Winterhawks 3–1, thus clinching their first ever playoff berth and the first in Victoria since 1989. The first-ever playoff goal was scored by Robin Soudek, while Jamie Crooks recorded the first playoff hat-trick in Royals history in Game 3. In spite of this, the Royals were swept in the first round by the Kamloops Blazers.

Head coaches
On June 22, 2012, Marc Habscheid, the first head coach and general manager of the Royals, left both positions to take an executive position with GSL Holdings Ltd., the parent company of the Royals' ownership group. The Royals named Cam Hope, formerly an assistant general manager of the NHL's New York Rangers, as their new GM on July 6.

On July 19, 2012, the Royals named Dave Lowry as head coach for the 2012–13 season.  Lowry coached the Royals for five seasons, leading the team to franchise highs in wins and points on the way to a Scotty Munro Memorial Trophy as WHL regular season champions in 2015-16.  After failing to achieve significant playoff success with the Royals, Lowry left the club to take a job as an assistant coach with the NHL's Los Angeles Kings in 2017.

On June 12, 2017, the Royals promoted assistant coach Dan Price to the head coaching position.  Price became the fourth head coach in franchise history, and third since the team relocated from Chilliwack to Victoria.

Players and personnel

Current roster
Updated February 5, 2023

 

 

 

 

 

  

 

 

 

 

 

 

 

 

 

  

 

 

 

 

 

 

 

|}

Team captains
 Hayden Rintoul, 2011–2012
 Tyler Stahl, 2012–2013
 Jordan Fransoo, 2013–2014
 Joe Hicketts, 2014–2016
 Ryan Gagnon, 2016–2017
 Matthew Phillips, 2017–2018
 Phillip Schultz, 2019–2020
 Tarun Fizer, 2021–2022
 Gannon Laroque 2022-present

Head coaches
 Marc Habscheid, 2011–2012
 Dave Lowry, 2012–2017
 Dan Price, 2017–present

Season-by-season record
Note: GP = Games played, W = Wins, L = Losses, OTL = Overtime losses, SOL = Shootout losses, GF = Goals for, GA = Goals against

NHL Draft picks
The following is a list of players drafted from the Victoria Royals by NHL teams.

Note: The list does not include players drafted from the Chilliwack Bruins, or players acquired by the Royals that were already drafted while with a previous team.  The list also does not include undrafted players who subsequently signed as free agents with NHL clubs.

Steven Hodges (Drafted by Florida Panthers in 2012, 3rd round, 84th overall) 
Logan Nelson (Drafted by Buffalo Sabres in 2012, 5th round, 133rd overall)
Keegan Kanzig (Drafted by Calgary Flames in 2013, 3rd round, 67th overall)
Austin Carroll (Drafted by Calgary Flames in 2014; 7th round, 184th overall)
Chaz Reddekopp (Drafted by Los Angeles Kings in 2015, 7th round, 187th overall)
Vladimir Bobylev (Drafted by Toronto Maple Leafs in 2016, 5th round, 122nd overall)
Jack Walker (Drafted by Toronto Maple Leafs in 2016, 6th round, 152nd overall)
Matthew Phillips (Drafted by Calgary Flames in 2016, 6th round, 166th overall)
Tyler Soy (Drafted by Anaheim Ducks in 2016, 7th round, 205th overall)
Scott Walford (Drafted by Montreal Canadiens in 2017, 3rd round, 68th overall)
Gannon Laroque (Drafted by San Jose Sharks in 2021, 4th round, 103rd overall)

NHL alumni
The following is a list of players from the Victoria Royals who have played in the National Hockey League.

Noah Gregor
Joe Hicketts
Brayden Pachal
Matthew Phillips
Brayden Tracey

Club records
Note: The following club records do not include statistics from the Chilliwack Bruins and are complete through the end of the 2018–19 WHL season.

Season
Individual
 Most goals, 50, Matthew Phillips, 2016–17
 Most assists, 64, Matthew Phillips, 2017–18
 Most points, 112, Matthew Phillips, 2017–18
 Most penalty minutes: 159, Keegan Kanzig, 2012–13
 Best goals against average, 1.82, Griffen Outhouse, 2015–16
 Most shutouts, 6, Coleman Vollrath, 2014–15
 Most games played, goaltender: 63, Griffen Outhouse, 2016–17
 Most saves, goaltender: 1,829, Griffen Outhouse, 2016–17
Team
 Most wins: 50, 2015–16
 Most losses: 41, 2011–12
 Most points: 106, 2015–16
 Most goals for: 287, 2017–18
 Fewest goals for: 199, 2018–19
 Most goals against: 325, 2011–12
 Fewest goals against: 166, 2015–16

Career
 Most goals: 151, Tyler Soy, 2012–18
 Most assists: 176, Tyler Soy, 2012–18
 Most points: 327, Tyler Soy, 2012–18
 Most penalty minutes: 470, Austin Carroll, 2011–15
 Most games played, skater: 323, Tyler Soy, 2012–18
 Best goals against average: 2.73, Coleman Vollrath, 2012–16
 Most shutouts: 10, Griffen Outhouse, 2015–19
 Most games played, goaltender: 196, Griffen Outhouse, 2015–19
 Most saves, goaltender: 5,595, Griffen Outhouse, 2015–19

Awards and honours

Team
Scotty Munro Memorial Trophy
 WHL Regular Season Champion
 2015–16St. Clair Group Trophy
 WHL Marketing/Business Award
 2015–16

WHL Scholastic Team of the Year
 2016–17

Individual
Brad Hornung Trophy
 WHL Most Sportsmanlike Player
 Tyler Soy: 2015–16

Dunc McCallum Memorial Trophy
 WHL Coach of the Year
 Dave Lowry: 2013–14, 2015–16

Jim Piggott Memorial Trophy
 WHL Rookie of the Year
 Matthew Phillips: 2015–16

Lloyd Saunders Memorial Trophy
 WHL Executive of the Year
 Cam Hope: 2013–14WHL Western Conference First All-Star Team
Joe Hicketts: 2015–16
Matthew Phillips: 2016–17, 2017–18

WHL Western Conference Second All-Star Team
Joe Hicketts: 2014–15
Tyler Soy: 2015–16
Scott Walford: 2018–19

See also
List of ice hockey teams in British Columbia

References

External links
 Victoria Royals Official Web Site
 Island Royalty: Information, News, and Statistics on the Victoria Royals

 
Ice hockey teams in British Columbia
Ice hockey clubs established in 2011
Royals
Western Hockey League teams
2011 establishments in British Columbia